Vermunt is the name of several people, among whom:
 Kees Vermunt (1931–2019), Dutch professional footballer and football manager
 René Vermunt (born 1952), Dutch professional footballer and football manager